Myrsine divaricata known as weeping māpou or weeping matipo, is  a small tree up to  tall or often a shrub. It has a strongly divaricating habit with interlaced branched. The woody parts are stiff and pubescent when young. The small leathery simple leaves are borne on short petioles and may be slightly two lobed at the end. The very small yellow or reddish flowers may be borne singly or in small groups which mature into small purple, occasionally white, fruit.

References

divaricata
Divaricating plants
Flora of New Zealand